The Catoctin National Recreation Trail is a 26.6 mi (42.4 km) hiking trail that traverses federal, state, and municipal woodlands along the northern half of Catoctin Mountain in Frederick County in central Maryland, USA.  The hilly terrain is typical of western Maryland with large sections canopied under dense forest cover.

History
Original portions of the trail were constructed in the 1930s by the Works Progress Administration and the Civilian Conservation Corps.  The trail was later upgraded and completed by the Potomac Appalachian Trail Club between 1979 and 1982.  In 2011, the trail was designated a National Recreation Trail.

Route
The trail's southern terminus begins in Gambrill State Park (GMP). The trail travels north for  through the Forest, staying mostly to the east of the ridge crest on the bench of the mountain. After traveling  through CFSP the trail enters Catoctin Mountain Park (CMP),  a unit of the federal National Park Service.

Restrictions
Camping is permitted along the  Catoctin Trail only at Rock Run Campground, Gambrill State Park; the Manor and Houck Campgrounds, Cunningham Falls State Park; and Owens Creek Campground, CMP.

References

Hiking trails in Maryland
Protected areas of Frederick County, Maryland
Blue Ridge Mountains
National Recreation Trails in Maryland